Farmfoods is a British frozen food and grocery supermarket chain based in Cumbernauld, Scotland. It is owned by Eric Herd, and has over three hundred shops in the United Kingdom, of which more than a hundred are in Scotland.

History

The company started in 1955 as a meat-processing business. A shop was opened in Aberdeen in the 1970s, and by the mid-1980s the company had about twenty. 

In the 1990s it bought Capital Freezer Centres and Wallis Frozen Foods. In 2005 it had annual sales of just over £400 million, the highest of any private mid-market firm in Scotland in that year, and fourth-highest in the United Kingdom.

In 2011 Farmfoods and Asda made an unsuccessful bid for Iceland; Farmfoods would have acquired two hundred of the eight hundred stores.

The company is headquartered in Cumbernauld with some head office functions operating out of Birmingham and Solihull.

References

External links

Supermarkets of the United Kingdom
Retail companies of the United Kingdom
Food and drink companies of Scotland
Companies based in Aberdeen
Privately held companies of Scotland
Scottish brands
Food and drink companies established in 1955
Retail companies established in 1955
1955 establishments in Scotland